Wednesday Morning, 3 A.M. is the debut studio album by American folk rock duo Simon & Garfunkel. Following their early gig as "Tom and Jerry", Columbia Records signed the two in late 1963. It was produced by Tom Wilson and engineered by Roy Halee. The cover and the label include the subtitle exciting new sounds in the folk tradition. Recorded in March 1964, the album was released on October 19.

The album was initially unsuccessful, so Paul Simon moved to London, England and finished his first solo album The Paul Simon Songbook. Art Garfunkel continued his studies at Columbia University in his native New York City, before reuniting with Simon in late 1965. Wednesday Morning, 3 A.M. was re-released in January 1966 (to capitalize on their newly found radio success because of the overdubbing of the song "The Sound of Silence" in June 1965, adding electric guitars, bass guitar and a drum kit), and reached  30 on the Billboard 200. It was belatedly released in the UK two years later (in 1968) in both mono and stereo formats.

The song "He Was My Brother" was dedicated to Andrew Goodman, who was their friend and a classmate of Simon at Queens College.  Andrew Goodman volunteered in Freedom Summer during 1964 and was abducted and killed in the murders of Chaney, Goodman, and Schwerner.

The album is included in its entirety as part of the Simon & Garfunkel box sets Collected Works and The Columbia Studio Recordings (1964–1970).

Production
The album was produced by Tom Wilson and engineered by Roy Halee between March 10–31, 1964.

“Benedictus" was arranged and adapted from Orlando di Lasso's Missa Octavi toni, a Renaissance setting of the ordinary of the mass. The text, in Latin, is benedictus qui venit in nomine Domini (KJV: Blessed be he that cometh in the name of the Lord ). The song is arranged for two voices with cello and sparse guitar accompaniment.

Artwork
The album's cover photo was shot at the Fifth Avenue / 53rd Street subway station in New York City. In several concerts, Art Garfunkel related that during the photo session, several hundred pictures were taken that were unusable due to the "old familiar suggestion" on the wall in the background, which inspired Paul Simon to write the song "A Poem on the Underground Wall" for the duo's later Parsley, Sage, Rosemary and Thyme album.

Reception
The album was initially unsuccessful, having been released in the shadow of the British Invasion. This resulted in Paul Simon moving to England and Art Garfunkel continuing his studies at Columbia University in New York City, However it reached  24 on the UK Album Charts. Following the success of "The Sound of Silence," the album peaked at  30 on the Billboard album chart in 1966.

Track listing

Personnel
 Paul Simon – acoustic guitar, banjo on "Last Night I Had the Strangest Dream", vocals
 Art Garfunkel – vocals
 Barry Kornfeld – acoustic guitar
 Bill Lee – double bass

Charts

References

1964 debut albums
Simon & Garfunkel albums
Columbia Records albums
Albums produced by Tom Wilson (record producer)